In enzymology, a Cypridina-luciferin 2-monooxygenase is an enzyme that catalyzes the chemical reaction

Cypridina luciferin + O2  oxidized Cypridina luciferin + CO2 + hnu

Thus, the two substrates of this enzyme are Cypridina luciferin and O2, whereas its 3 products are oxidized Cypridina luciferin, CO2, and light.

This enzyme belongs to the family of oxidoreductases, specifically those acting on single donors with O2 as oxidant and incorporation of two atoms of oxygen into the substrate (oxygenases). The oxygen incorporated need not be derived from O with incorporation of one atom of oxygen (internal monooxygenases o internal mixed-function oxidases).  The systematic name of this enzyme class is Cypridina-luciferin:oxygen 2-oxidoreductase (decarboxylating). Other names in common use include Cypridina-type luciferase, luciferase (Cypridina luciferin), and Cypridina luciferase.

The primary sequence was determined by cloning the cDNA.

References

 
 
 
 

EC 1.13.12
Enzymes of unknown structure